Geoffroy Charles François Marie, Count d'Andigné (11 February 1858 – 10 March 1932) was a French politician. He served as mayor of Sainte-Gemmes-d'Andigné, and as a general councillor and deputy of Maine-et-Loire.

Personal life
Andigné was born on 11 February 1858 in Sainte-Gemmes-d'Andigné, Maine-et-Loire, a member of the Andigné family of French nobility. In 1885, he married Hélène Chandon de Briailles. Despite his advanced years, being 56 years old at the outbreak of World War I, he served in the army as a rider in the 28th Dragoon Regiment throughout. On his return he was awarded the Croix de guerre 1914–1918 and the Médaille militaire, in addition to being promoted as a non-commissioned officer. He died in Angers on 10 March 1932.

Politics
Andigné was first elected as a general councillor in 1908. He was re-elected in 1918, and became mayor of Sainte-Gemmes-d'Andigné in 1919. In 1924, he was elected to the Chamber of Deputies as a deputy for Maine-et-Loire; he was re-elected in 1928 and sat until his death in 1932. During his time in parliament he was a member of the agriculture committee.

Equestrian
Andigné competed in the equestrian mail coach event at the 1900 Summer Olympics.

References

External links
 

1858 births
1932 deaths
French male equestrians
Olympic equestrians of France
Equestrians at the 1900 Summer Olympics
Sportspeople from Maine-et-Loire
Recipients of the Croix de Guerre 1914–1918 (France)
Recipients of the Médaille militaire (France)
Members of the 13th Chamber of Deputies of the French Third Republic
Members of the 14th Chamber of Deputies of the French Third Republic
Politicians from Pays de la Loire